Barb Wire may refer to:
 Barb wire, a fencing material
 Barb Wire (character), a comic book superhero published by Dark Horse Comics
 Barb Wire (1996 film), starring Pamela Anderson, based on the comic book
 Barb Wire (pinball), pinball machine based on the 1996 film
 Barb Wire (soundtrack), soundtrack album of the 1996 film
 Barb Wire (1922 film), an American silent film starring Jack Hoxie

See also
 Barbwire Bowl Classic, an American football game
 Barbed Wire (disambiguation)
 Barbed tape, aka razorwire
 Barb (disambiguation)
 Wire (disambiguation)